Namakhvani Hydro Power Plant will be a large power plant to be built in the Tskaltubo and Tsageri municipalities north of Kutaisi, Imereti region, Georgia and will have five turbines with a nominal capacity of 50 MW each having a total capacity of 250 MW.

Local population has concerns about safety of this dam.

See also

 List of power stations in Georgia (country)
 Energy in Georgia (country)

References

Hydroelectric power stations in Georgia (country)
Proposed hydroelectric power stations
Proposed renewable energy power stations in Georgia (country)